Miss Europe 1931 is the fourth annual Miss Europe live in Paris and the third under French journalist Maurice de Waleffe. 16 European girls in Europe compete the third annual pageant. Miss France won Miss Europe 1931 named Jeanne Juilla.

Results

Placements

Delegates

 - Herta (Hertha) von Haetjens
 - Anita Netta Duchateau
 -  Inga Arvad
 - Betty Grace Mason
 - Lilli Silberg
 - Jeanne Juilla
 -   Ingrid Ruth Richard
 - Chryssoula Rodis
 - Mary Lelyveld

 - Maria Tasnady-Fekete
 - Claudia Nocetti
 - Tanti Vuroseanu
 (In exile) - Marina Shalyapina
 - Ermelina Carreño Rodríguez
 -  Naschide Saffet Hanim
 - Katica Urbanović

National pageant notes

Debuts/Returns
Estonia participated for the 1st time as its own country. Lilli Silberg was 1st Runner-Up. Estonia was represented as the Baltic States in 1927.

Withdrawals
Bulgaria,  Czechoslovakia, Ireland, and Poland

References

External links

Miss Europe
1931 in Paris
Beauty pageants in France